Fast Freight is a 1929 American short silent comedy film. It was the 85th Our Gang short that was released.

Cast

The Gang
 Joe Cobb as Joe
 Jean Darling as Jean
 Allen Hoskins as Farina
 Bobby Hutchins as Wheezer
 Mary Ann Jackson as Mary Ann
 Harry Spear as Harry
 Pete the Pup as himself

Additional cast
 Robert Dudley as Chief of Police

See also
 Our Gang filmography

References

External links

Still at gettyimages.com

1929 films
1929 comedy films
1929 short films
American silent short films
American black-and-white films
Metro-Goldwyn-Mayer short films
Our Gang films
1920s American films
Silent American comedy films
1920s English-language films